Gladys O'Connor (28 November 1903 – 21 February 2012) was a British-born Canadian character actress. Born in London, O'Connor moved with her family to Hamilton, Ontario, Canada in 1912, eventually settling in Toronto.

After several decades as a businesswoman, O'Connor pursued an acting career in the 1980s, appearing in films such as Police Academy 3: Back in Training (1986), Billy Madison (1995), Fly Away Home (1996), Harriet the Spy (1996), The Long Kiss Goodnight (1996), and Half Baked (1998). O'Connor's last role was in 1998.

Early life
Born in London, England, United Kingdom in 1903, she and her family moved to Canada when she was nine. Before becoming an actress, she worked as a saleswoman, accountant and bookkeeper.

Career 
O'Connor began acting in American television series and films in the middle of the 1980s. Her first appearance was in Police Academy 3: Back in Training in 1986. Some of her other credits are Stepping Out, Harriet the Spy, Billy Madison, Matrix, and The Long Kiss Goodnight.

She played a cranky but kind farm woman in Fly Away Home (1996). Her last role came in 1998 when she played Mavis in the television movie The Garbage Picking Field Goal Kicking Philadelphia Phenomenon.

Death 
She died in 2012 in Toronto at the age of 108.

Filmography

Film

Television

References

External links
 

1903 births
2012 deaths
British television actresses
British centenarians
British film actresses
British emigrants to Canada
Canadian people of English descent
Canadian television actresses
Canadian centenarians
Canadian film actresses
Women centenarians